Nelly and Nellie are female given names, also used as nicknames, which are derived from the names Helen, Ellen, Petronella, Danielle, Cornelia, Eleanor, Janelle, Chanelle, Penelope or Noelia.

People

Women
Nelly (Egyptian entertainer) (Nelly Artin Kalfayan, born 1949), Egyptian-Armenian entertainer, actress and presenter 
Nelly Arcan (1973–2009), Canadian writer, born Isabelle Fortier
Nellie Barsness (1873–1966), American physician
Nelly Beltrán (1925–2007), Argentine actress, born Nélida Dodó López Valverde
Nelly Ben-Or (born 1933), Polish concert pianist and professor
Nelly Blair (1759–1820), later Nelly Smith, sometimes suggested as being Scottish poet Robert Burns' first love (see also Nelly Kilpatrick)
Nellie Bly (1864–1922), American journalist
Nellie Moyer Budd (1860–1944), American music teacher
Nellie Marie Burns (ca. 1850–1897), American actor and poet
Nelly Ciobanu (born 1974), Moldovan singer
Ellen Crocker (1872–1962) also known as 'Nellie' or 'Nelly', British suffragette
Nellie Farren (1848–1904), English actress and singer
Nelly Furtado (born 1978), Canadian singer-songwriter, instrumentalist, and record producer
Nelly Armande Guillerm, birth name of Violette Verdy (1933–2016), French ballerina, choreographer, teacher, dance company director and writer
Nelly Garzón Alarcón (1932–2019), Colombian nurse, teacher
Nellie A. Hope (1864-1918), American violinist, music teacher, orchestra conductor
Nelly Karim (born 1974), Egyptian actress, model and ballerina
Nelly Kilpatrick, later Nelly Bone (1759–1820), possibly Robert Burns' first love and muse (see also Nelly Blair)
Nellie Kim (born 1957), Soviet gymnast
Nellie van Kol (1851-1930), Dutch feminist, educator, and children's author
Nelly Korda (born 1998), American golfer
Nelly Láinez (1920–2008), Argentine comedic actress
Nelly Landry (1916–2010), French tennis player, 1948 French Open champion
Nellie McClung (1873–1951), Canadian feminist, politician, and social activist
Nellie McKay (born 1982), British-born American singer-songwriter and actress
Nellie V. Mark (1857–1935), American physician and suffragist
Nelly Nichol Marshall (1845–1898), American author
Nelly Mazloum (1929–2003), Egyptian actress, choreographer, dancer and dance teacher
Nellie Melba (1861–1931), Australian opera soprano
Nelly Olin (born 1941), Minister of Environment in France (2005–07)
Nellie Roberts (1872–1959), British botanical artist
Nellie Tayloe Ross (1876–1977), first American woman state governor
Nelly Sachs (1891–1970), German poet and dramatist awarded the 1966 Nobel Prize for Literature, born Leonie Sachs
Nellie R. Santiago (born 1943), New York state senator
Nellie George Stearns (1855–1936), American artist and teacher of art
Eleanor Nellie Stewart (1858–1931), Australian actress and singer
Nelly Such (born 1992), Hungarian handballer
Nelly Ternan or Nelly Robinson, names used for Ellen Ternan (1839–1914), English actress, mistress of Charles Dickens
Nelly Thüring (1875–1972), Swedish politician, one of the first women elected to the Swedish parliament
Nelly Viennot (born 1962), French football referee
Nelly Walker, birth name of Nella Larsen (1891–1964), American modernist novelist
Nelly Wicky (born 1923), Swiss Labour Party politician and former member of the Swiss National Council
Nellie Yu Roung Ling (1889–1973), Chinese dancer and lady-in-waiting in Qing imperial court

Men
Nellie King (1928–2010), American baseball player and radio announcer
Nelly, stage name of American rapper Cornell Iral Haynes Jr.
Don Nelson (born 1940), American former basketball coach and player nicknamed "Nellie"

Fictional characters
Nellie Bertram, a character from The Office (U.S.), played by Catherine Tate
Nelly Dean, in Emily Brontë's novel Wuthering Heights
Nellie Oleson, from the Little House on the Prairie children's books and TV series
Nellie Pledge, a fictional character in the Granada Television series Nearest and Dearest, played by Hylda Baker
Nellie Brie, from the film An American Tail: The Mystery of the Night Monster
Nellie Crain, from the Netflix limited series The Haunting of Hill House (TV series), played by Victoria Pedretti
Nellie Gray, ally of The Avenger
Nellie Forbush, heroine of the Rodgers and Hammerstein musical South Pacific
Nellie O'Malley, a character from the American Girl series
Nellie, subject of the 1956 song "Nellie the Elephant" and Nellie the Elephant (TV series)
Nelly, the legal guardian and 'aunt' to Vladimir Tod in The Chronicles of Vladimir Tod written by Heather Brewer
Nelliel Tu Odelschwanck, known as Nel Tu, a small, good-natured, character in the manga Bleach
Nel Rawlison, in Henryk Sienkiewicz's novel In Desert and Wilderness

See also
Nella
Nell

Feminine given names
Hypocorisms